Britta Ernst (born 23 February 1961) is a German politician of the Social Democratic Party of Germany who has served as Education Minister of Brandenburg since 2017. She was a member of the Hamburg Parliament from 1997 to 2011, served as School Minister of Schleswig-Holstein from 2014 to 2017, and as president of the Kultusministerkonferenz in 2021. She is the wife of Chancellor Olaf Scholz.

Early life 
Ernst was born in Hamburg. After her Abitur in 1980, she completed an apprenticeship in real estate. Afterwards, Ernst studied general economics, graduating in 1990, and social economics, graduating in 1992.

Ernst is a member of the Friedrich Ebert Foundation and of the ver.di union.

In 1998, Ernst married fellow politician Olaf Scholz, who was elected Chancellor of Germany in 2021. The couple lives in Potsdam.

Political career 
Ernst has been an active member of the Social Democratic Party of Germany (SPD) since 1978. From 1991 to 1993 as a member of the Altona district assembly. In 1993 she was senator 's personal advisor. From 1994 to 1997 she was senator Thomas Mirow's personal advisor. Ernst was a member of the Hamburg Parliament from 8 October 1997 to 31 August 2011. She represented the SPD in the school committee, science committee and the special committee for neglected children. She was also a member of the commission for school development. From 2001 to 2006 she was deputy parliamentary group leader of the SPD parliamentary group and spokesperson for school policy. Her political priorities are school and education policy as well as gender equality. From 2006 to the beginning of 2011, Ernst was the parliamentary director of her faction. During this term of office, Ernst served as the SPD's spokesperson on constitutional matters. In addition, she continued to serve on the school committee and started to serve on the constitutional and district committee.

During the 2009 Schleswig-Holstein state election, Ernst was a member of Ralf Stegner's shadow cabinet. In the 2011 Hamburg state election, she was re-elected to the Hamburg parliament, but resigned on 31 August of the same year in order to work as deputy parliamentary group manager for the SPD faction in the German Bundestag. In 2014, she was appointed Minister for School and Professional Education of the state of Schleswig-Holstein in minister-president Torsten Albig's cabinet and served as such until 2017, as well as deputy member of the German Bundesrat from 2014 to 2017.

Since September 2017, Ernst has been serving as State Minister for Education, Youth and Sport of Brandenburg in minister-president Dietmar Woidke's cabinet. From 2017 to 2019, she has been a member of the German Bundesrat, and has been a deputy member since 2019. In 2021, she also served as President of the Kultusministerkonferenz, the assembly of ministers of education of the German states.

Other activities 
 Stiftung Lesen, Member of the Board of Trustees

References

External links 
 
 Ministerin Ernst at the Ministry for Education, Youth and Sport
 

Living people
1961 births
Politicians from Hamburg
20th-century German women politicians
Social Democratic Party of Germany politicians
Members of the Hamburg Parliament
Olaf Scholz
21st-century German women politicians
Ministers of the Schleswig-Holstein State Government
Women ministers of State Governments in Germany
Ministers of the Brandenburg State Government
Spouses of chancellors of Germany